is a transportation company in Kōchi, Kōchi, Japan. The public company operates tram and bus lines.

History
Tosa Electric Railway was founded on July 8, 1903, and the tram line was opened on May 2, 1904. The company also operated a heavy railway line called , but it was closed in 1974. The company was commonly known as  among locals, while people in other prefectures tend to call it , as the word Toden can be confusing with Tokyo Metropolitan Tramway, which was commonly called .

Tosa Electric Railway and Kōchiken Kōtsū introduced DESUCA, a smart card ticket system, from January 2009.

In June 2014, the shareholders of Tosa Electric Railway and Kōchiken Kōtsū, both in the state of insolvency, approved the reconstruction plan, under which the companies' businesses be transferred to the newly established company funded by Kōchi Prefecture and other 12 municipalities. The name of the company was selected from 1,235 proposals from the public.

Tram lines
There are three lines with 76 stations, covering a total distance of 25.3 km. It is the second longest tram network in Japan, after Hiroshima Electric Railway. The network in Kōchi, however, has suffered from declining ridership since the 1960s. In an attempt to reverse this trend, the company has tried introducing newly built stations and cars, but has not seen much success. The Government of Kōchi Prefecture, as well as that of Kōchi City are considering plans to support the company.

Lines
Sanbashi Line: Kōchi-Ekimae — Harimayabashi — Sambashidōri-Gochōme
Ino Line: Harimayabashi — Ino
Most tramcars directly continue to Gomen Line.
Gomen Line: Harimayabashi — Gomenmachi
Most tramcars directly continue to Ino Line.

Connections
Asahi-Ekimaedōri Station: JR Shikoku Dosan Line (Asahi)
Asakura-Ekimae Station: Dosan Line (Asakura)
Edagawa Station: Dosan Line
Gomenmachi Station: Tosa Kuroshio Railway Asa Line
Ino-Ekimae Station: Dosan Line (Ino)
Kōchi-Ekimae Station: Dosan Line (Kōchi)

Bus lines
The company operates long-distance buses linking Kōchi City and major cities of Japan, including Tokyo, Nagoya, Osaka, Hiroshima, and Fukuoka. It also operates a local network in/around the city.

See also
List of light-rail transit systems
Little Dancer, one of the LRVs operated on its lines

References

External links 

 Official website 
 Official website 

Bus companies of Japan
Tram transport in Japan
Companies based in Kōchi Prefecture